Veizaga or Véizaga is a surname.  Notable people with the surname include:

 Betty Veizaga (born 1957), Bolivian folk musician
 Benedicto Godoy Véizaga (born 1924), Bolivian footballer
 Cielo Veizaga (born 2001), Bolivian footballer and politician
 Wálter Veizaga (born 1988), Bolivian footballer